Jack Solomon (March 8, 1913 – November 8, 2002) was an American sound engineer. He won an Oscar for Sound Recording and was nominated for five more in the same category. He worked on over 90 films between 1953 and 1991.

Selected filmography
Solomon won an Academy Award and was nominated for five more:

Won
 Hello, Dolly! (1969)

Nominated
 Kotch (1971)
 Funny Lady (1975)
 King Kong (1976)
 Hooper (1978)
 Meteor (1979)

References

External links

1913 births
2002 deaths
American audio engineers
People from Manhattan
Best Sound Mixing Academy Award winners
CAS Career Achievement Award honorees